Casanova's Homecoming is an opera in three acts by Dominick Argento to an English libretto by the composer, based in part on Giacomo Casanova's memoirs. It was first performed by the Minnesota Opera in Saint Paul, Minnesota in 1985.

The opera has set numbers with recitative and spoken dialog. It is set in Venice in 1774.

Roles

References

Discography
 D.Brown; Jacoby, 2001 [live] Newport Classic

External links
 Boosey & Hawks page

English-language operas
Operas by Dominick Argento
Operas
Operas based on real people
Operas set in the 18th century
1985 operas
Works about Giacomo Casanova
Operas set in Venice
Fiction set in 1744
Cultural depictions of Giacomo Casanova